Gennaro Volpe (born 17 February 1981) is a former Italian footballer turned coach. He is currently the head coach of  side Virtus Entella.

Playing career
A former midfielder, he played for Empoli, Prato, Ascoli, Mantova and Cittadella. He retired in 2016 after five years at Virtus Entella.

Coaching career
After retiring as a player, he stayed at Virtus Entella as a youth coach. On 6 May 2018, he was named new head coach in place of dismissed manager Alfredo Aglietti, taking over a Virtus Entella side in deep relegation trouble (20th place with two games to go). Virtus Entella were eventually relegated after losing a two-legged playoff to Ascoli, and Volpe moved back into coaching the Under-19 team afterwards.

On 12 April 2021, he was moved once again in charge of the first team, taking over from Vincenzo Vivarini as Virtus Entella was at the bottom of the Serie B league table with five games to go. Later on 1 May 2021, Virtus Entella were mathematically relegated to Serie C following a home loss to Vicenza, having achieved only a single point during Volpe's first three games in charge of the club.

Managerial statistics

References

External links
 

1981 births
Living people
Italian footballers
Italian football managers
Empoli F.C. players
A.C. Prato players
Ascoli Calcio 1898 F.C. players
Mantova 1911 players
A.S. Cittadella players
Virtus Entella players
Serie B players
Association football midfielders
Serie B managers
Serie C managers